Abag Bay is a bay in Mindanao, Philippines. Abag is bight, which also contains the village of Kalaguhan.

References

Bays of the Philippines
Landforms of Davao Oriental